Adventures in Paradise is an American television series created by James Michener and starring Gardner McKay, which ran on ABC from 1959 until 1962.

Premise 
Gardner McKay starred as Adam Troy, the captain of the schooner Tiki III, which sailed the South Pacific looking for passengers and adventure. The plots deal with the romantic and detective adventures of Korean War veteran Troy. The supporting cast, varying from season to season, featured George Tobias, Guy Stockwell, and Linda Lawson. Jacques Tourneur directed the 1962 episode "A Bride for the Captain".

Cast

Main
Gardner McKay as Capt. Adam Troy
James Holden as Clay Baker (seasons 2–3)
Guy Stockwell as Chris Parker (season 3)

Recurring

Weaver Levy as Oliver Lee (season 1)
Henry Slate as Bulldog Lovey (season 1)
Linda Lawson as Renee (seasons 1–2)
George Tobias as Trader Penrose (season 2)
Lani Kai as Kelly (seasons 2–3)
Marcel Hillaire as Inspector Bouchard (seasons 2–3)

Guest stars

Philip Ahn
John Anderson
Phyllis Avery
Barbara Bain
Diane Baker
Joanna Barnes
Henry Brandon
Hans Conried
Hazel Court
Yvonne De Carlo
Gloria DeHaven
Meyer Dolinsky
Fifi D'Orsay
Chana Eden
Barbara Eden
Elana Eden
Anne Francis
Betty Garde
Peggy Ann Garner
Bruce Gordon
Alan Hale Jr.
Juano Hernández
Steven Hill
James Hong
Rodolfo Hoyos Jr.
David Janssen
Tor Johnson
Richie Kamuca
Anna Kashfi
Werner Klemperer
Martin Landau
Bethel Leslie
Gene Levitt
Joanne Linville
Dayton Lummis
Diana Lynn
Patrick Macnee
George Macready
Arthur Malet
Murray Matheson
Marilyn Maxwell
Nobu McCarthy
Sean McClory
Joanna Moore
Read Morgan
Simon Oakland
Joan O'Brien
Dan O'Herlihy
Susan Oliver
J. Pat O'Malley
Larry Pennell
Suzanne Pleshette
Judson Pratt
Vincent Price
Juliet Prowse
Hari Rhodes
Brian Roper
Jacqueline Scott
Lizabeth Scott
Pippa Scott
Pilar Seurat
Robert F. Simon
Alexis Smith
Fay Spain
Barbara Steele
Inger Stevens
Barbara Stuart
Joan Tompkins
Betsy von Furstenberg
Jesse White
Peter Whitney
Anna May Wong
Jo Anne Worley
Dick York

Episodes

Season 1 (1959–60)

Season 2 (1960–61)

Season 3 (1961–62)

Musical theme
"Theme from Adventures in Paradise" was composed by Lionel Newman. It has been recorded by numerous artists, including  Arthur Lyman, Santo & Johnny, Rob E. G., The Atlantics, and Johnnie Spence and his Orchestra. Newman was a senior music director for Twentieth Century Fox Films and was conductor and music supervisor for the Adventures in Paradise series. 

Lyrics to the theme were written by Dorcas Cochran, and are heard on the version recorded by Bing Crosby. Cochran is also credited as writer alongside Newman on some instrumental recordings.

A 45 rpm single of "Theme from Adventures in Paradise" by Jerry Byrd and his Steel Guitar charted in the United States, peaking in August 1960 at No. 97 in Billboard magazine and No. 80 in Cash Box

Broadcast syndication 
USA Network aired reruns of this series between 1984 and 1988.

References

External links

1959 American television series debuts
1962 American television series endings
American adventure television series
American Broadcasting Company original programming
Black-and-white American television shows
English-language television shows
Nautical television series
Television series by 20th Century Fox Television
Television shows set in Oceania
Works by James A. Michener